An English cricket team raised by Marylebone Cricket Club (MCC) toured the West Indies from January to March 1926 and played twelve first-class matches, including three against the West Indies cricket team which had not then achieved Test status. MCC, who were captained by Freddie Calthorpe, played their matches at Kensington Oval, Bridgetown; Queen's Park Oval, Port of Spain; Bourda, Georgetown; Sabina Park, Kingston; and Melbourne Park, also in Kingston. In the matches between the West Indies and MCC, the first in Bridgetown was drawn; MCC won by 5 wickets in Port of Spain; and the final match in Georgetown was drawn.

The team
Freddie Calthorpe (captain)
Ewart Astill
Tris Bennett
George Collins
Leonard Crawley
Horace Dales
Wally Hammond
Percy Holmes
Tom Jameson
Roy Kilner
Fred Root
Tiger Smith
Lionel Tennyson
Frank Watson

References

External links
Marylebone Cricket Club in West Indies 1925-26 at CricketArchive
English cricket team in the West Indies in 1925–26 at CricHQ

1926 in English cricket
1926 in West Indian cricket
1926
International cricket competitions from 1918–19 to 1945
West Indian cricket seasons from 1918–19 to 1944–45